"Shadows of Your Love" is a 1986 song performed by J.M. Silk featuring Steve "Silk" Hurley.

The composition was written by Danny Wilson, Keith Nunnally and Peter Black, and in addition released on the J.M. Silk's only album Hold on to Your Dream, issued in 1987 on RCA Records. The single charted at number three on US Dance chart.

Credits and personnel
Keith Nunnally - writer, lead vocal, back vocal
Steve Hurley - back vocal, producer, mix,
Lewis Bledsoe - back vocal
Sampson "Butch" Moore - back vocal
Danny Wilson - writer
Peter Black - writer
Larry Sturm - engineer
Rocky Jones - executive producer
Herbie Jr - mastering
Bruce Forest - mix
Farley "Jack Master" Funk - mix
Glen Erler - photography

Official versions
"Shadows of Your Love (Album Version) - 4:04"
"Shadows of Your Love (House Mix)"
"Shadows of Your Love (Acappella/Beats Mix)"
"Shadows of Your Love (Fierce Mix)"
"Shadows of Your Love (Original Mix)"

Charts

Weekly charts

See also
List of artists who reached number one on the US Dance chart

References

External links
 [ Steve "Silk" Hurley] on AllMusic
 [ J.M. Silk] on AllMusic

1985 songs
1986 singles
Steve "Silk" Hurley songs
Songs written by Keith Nunnally
RCA Records singles